Mirza Hasan (also Romanized as Mīrzā Ḩasan; also known as Mazrāh Ḩasan) is a village in Bizaki Rural District, Golbajar District, Chenaran County, Razavi Khorasan Province, Iran. At the 2006 census, its population was 19, in 6 families.

References 

Populated places in Chenaran County